Terry Morrison is the name of:
Terry Morrison (politician), state legislator from Maine
Terry Morrison (academic), Canadian academic
Terry Morrison (rugby union), New Zealand rugby player